A referendum on increasing the number of members of the Landtag from 15 to 21 was held in Liechtenstein on 2 July 1972. As happened in 1945, the proposal was rejected by voters.

Results

References

1972 referendums
1972 in Liechtenstein
Referendums in Liechtenstein
July 1972 events in Europe